John Francis Kane (February 19, 1900 – July 25, 1956) was a professional baseball player.  He was an infielder for one season (1925) with the Chicago White Sox.  For his career, he compiled a .179 batting average in 56 at-bats, with three runs batted in.

He was born and later died in Chicago, Illinois at the age of 56.

External links

1900 births
1956 deaths
Chicago White Sox players
Major League Baseball infielders
Birmingham Barons players
Houston Buffaloes players
Baseball players from Chicago